Fools for Scandal is a 1938 screwball comedy film starring Carole Lombard and Fernand Gravet, featuring Ralph Bellamy, Allen Jenkins, Isabel Jeans, Marie Wilson and Marcia Ralston, and produced and directed by Mervyn LeRoy. It was written by Herbert Fields and Joseph Fields with additional dialogue by Irving Brecher, and uncredited contributions by others based on the unproduced 1936 play Return Engagement by Nancy Hamilton, James Shute and Rosemary Casey.  The songs are by Richard Rodgers and Lorenz Hart.

Fools for Scandal is now best remembered as one of Lombard's worst films and one that set her on the course for seeking dramatic roles for the next few years.

Plot
Film star Kay Winters (Carole Lombard) is traveling through Paris under a wig and the pseudonym of Kay Summers with her maid and companion Myrtle (Marie Wilson). She meets Rene (Fernand Gravet), a French marquis who has lost all his money and has pawned all his material possessions to live, something Paris society does not know. He sees her on the street and offers to give her a tour of the real Paris. Kay, who already had plans to attend dinner with Lady Paula Malverton (Isabel Jeans), tries to brush him off, only to become charmed by the persistent and impetuous Rene. Once finished with the tour, they have dinner, and unexpectedly run into Lady Malverton and her party. Lady Malverton calls Rene over to her table. When he returns, he discovers that Kay has left. However, she left a note asking him to lunch with her the following day.

Kay returns to her hotel, to see Phillip Chester (Ralph Bellamy) waiting for her, the man who is in love with her. The next day, Kay is waiting by the fountain and Rene discovers that he has overslept. His friend, Dewey Gilson (Allen Jenkins), has taken too long getting Rene's suit from the pawn shop. Rene waits, helplessly, as Kay prepares to leave. However, he runs down and obtains two carpets from a salesman, wrapping them around himself as a form of wealthy robe. He alerts Kay that he will be ready to have lunch in just a while, but two women, who believe that he is selling the carpets, demand to buy them. In an argument about who can buy the carpets between the women and Kay, the carpets are pulled from Rene and he runs away in his underwear.

Later, Rene discovers that Kay is actually a movie star. Before he can contact her, however, she leaves for London. Rene follows her. He comes to her house at a party in which Kay has ordered her guests to appear in animal masks. Upon seeing Rene, she invites him to dinner, where Lady Malverton tells him to demonstrate his skills as a chef. After tasting the food that Rene prepares, Kay, as a joke, offers him a job as her cook. Rene, delighted, accepts without Kay knowing. Meanwhile, Phillip begs Kay to marry him, but she again postpones her answer.

Lady Malverton finds Rene in the kitchen, where he tells her that he has taken the job of being Kay's chef. Lady Malverton spreads the gossip. The following morning, Kay is delivered breakfast by Rene and begs him to leave. Rene tells her he has no such intention and answers the phone several times and tells everyone he is Kay's chef. Lady Malverton arrives with a swarm of gossips and demands to know the truth. Kay tells them that she has hired him as a chef. Nonetheless, the tabloids are already running reports that Rene is Kay's "love chef".

Kay, undaunted, accepts Phillip's proposal of marriage and orders an engagement dinner. Rene does his best to spoil the dinner and succeeds, with Phillip walking out of the house after a quarrel with Kay. Rene finally gets Kay to admit she loves him, but she tells him that she will not marry him, as the difference in social status between them will earn her the derision of everyone she knows. Rene tells her that he is a French marquis and leaves, angered by her silly fears. Kay follows him into an opera house where they kiss before an unexpected audience.

Cast

 Carole Lombard as Kay Winters
 Fernand Gravet as Rene Vilardell
 Ralph Bellamy as Philip Chester
 Allen Jenkins as Dewey Gilson
 Isabel Jeans as Lady Paula Malverton
 Marie Wilson as Myrtle

 Marcia Ralston as Jill
 Tola Nesmith as Agnes
 Heather Thatcher as Lady Potter-Porter
 Jacques Lory as Papa Joli-Coeur
 Tempie Piggott as Bessie

Cast notes:
Fools for Scandal featured a cameo by Lombard's beloved Pekingese, Pushface, and was the third pairing of Lombard and Bellamy.

Production
The working title of the film, which was originally planned to be filmed in Technicolor, was "Food for Scandal"; both titles were inspired by Sheridan's classic play The School for Scandal. The film was Lombard's first and last for Warner Bros., and Mervyn LeRoy's last: afterward, he went to MGM.

Fernand Gravet came to Warners after having achieved considerable success in French films under the name "Fernand Gravey", but the failure of Fools for Scandal prevented him from achieving star status in the United States.  He made one other film in the US, The Great Waltz for MGM, before returning to France.

Warners borrowed Ted Tetzlaff, Lombard's favorite cinematographer, from Paramount Pictures for the film, so that Lombard would be comfortable with how she was shot.  She later said that she knew Fools for Scandal was a flop "when my friends confined their comments to how beautifully I had been photographed".  Unfortunately for her, she was never able to work with Tetzlaff again.

Reception
Fools for Scandal was an enormous box-office failure. Although Lombard considered The Gay Bride her worst film, many contemporary fans give Fools for Scandal that distinction. Lombard lacked chemistry with Gravet, and audiences, who had already begun tiring of screwball comedies, noted a similarity between the plots of Fools for Scandal and Lombard's previous screwball film My Man Godfrey.

Fools's failure prompted Lombard to pursue only dramatic roles for the next few years until she joined Alfred Hitchcock and Robert Montgomery for 1941's Mr. & Mrs. Smith.

References

External links

 
 
 
 

1938 films
1938 romantic comedy films
1930s screwball comedy films
American romantic comedy films
American screwball comedy films
1930s English-language films
Films directed by Mervyn LeRoy
Films set in London
Films set in Paris
Warner Bros. films
American black-and-white films
1930s American films